Zona Industrial Tupy is an industrial quarter located in the city of Joinville, Santa Catarina, Brazil. The area is occupied by the Complexo Industrial Tupy.

References

Economy of Joinville
Neighbourhoods in Joinville